Velington Rocha (born 24 May 1991) is an Indian professional footballer who plays as a midfielder.

Career

Early career
Born in Salcette, Goa, Rocha started his career at the youth side of Sporting Clube de Goa where he stayed till 2009 when he joined the youth side of Pune. He then went on loan to Margao SC of the Goa Professional League during the 2011–12 season.

Pune
After spending a season at Margao, Rocha returned to Pune F.C. in the I-League and made his professional debut for the side in the league on 29 October 2012 against East Bengal F.C. at the Salt Lake Stadium. He came on in the 91st minute for Srikanth Ramu as Pune lost the match 1–0.

Career statistics

References

External links 
 Pune Football Club Profile.
 I-League Profile.

1991 births
Living people
People from South Goa district
Indian footballers
Pune FC players
Association football midfielders
Footballers from Goa
I-League players